Temnora reutlingeri is a moth of the family Sphingidae. It is known from Nigeria to Gabon.

It is similar to Temnora griseata ugandae and shows the same dimorphism in forewing upperside pattern, but it differs in forewing upperside ground colour, which is brownish, and in characters of the genitalia.

Subspecies
Temnora reutlingeri reutlingeri
Temnora reutlingeri bousqueti Darge, 1989 (Bioko)

References

Temnora
Moths described in 1889
Insects of the Democratic Republic of the Congo
Insects of West Africa
Fauna of Gabon
Moths of Africa